The Platinum Collection is a career spanning greatest hits album by Australian country music artist John Williamson. The album was released in August 2006, peaked at number 25 on the ARIA Charts and was certified platinum in 2009.

Track listing

Charts

Weekly charts

Year-end charts

Release history

Certifications

References

2006 greatest hits albums
John Williamson (singer) compilation albums
EMI Records compilation albums